Carman Griffin Maxwell (December 27, 1902 – September 22, 1987) was an American animator and voice actor.

Maxwell was born in Siloam Springs, Arkansas, and later moved to Kansas City, Missouri. He began his career with Walt Disney at the Laugh-O-Gram Studio where Maxwell, along with Hugh Harman, Rudolf Ising, and Friz Freleng, was part of the unit that eventually broke away from Disney to form the nucleus of what later became the Warner Bros. animation studio (under contract with Leon Schlesinger). Before going to Harman-Ising, he animated for Oswald the Lucky Rabbit for Disney and Winkler Pictures, with his Disney alumni. 

Besides animating for Harman-Ising, Maxwell also performed the voice of their most famous creation, Bosko. Maxwell was also later a production manager in the Metro-Goldwyn-Mayer cartoon studio, working there as late as 1953.

References

External links 

American animators
American male voice actors
1902 births
1987 deaths
Warner Bros. Cartoons voice actors
20th-century American male actors
Warner Bros. Cartoons people
People from Siloam Springs, Arkansas
Animators from Arkansas
Laugh-O-Gram Studio people
Walt Disney Animation Studios people
Metro-Goldwyn-Mayer cartoon studio people